These are the complete Grand Prix racing results for Sauber also including BMW Sauber.

Complete Formula One results
(key)

Notes

† – The driver did not finish the Grand Prix, but was classified as he completed over 90% of the race distance.
‡ – Half points awarded as less than 75% of race distance was completed.

References

Formula One constructor results
results